PTSA may refer to:

 Kosrae International Airport, an airport serving Kosrae, the easternmost state of the Federated States of Micronesia by ICAO code
 p-Toluenesulfonic acid
 Parent-Teacher-Student Association
 Philippine Tiong Se Academy, the oldest Chinese school in the Philippines. (est. 1899)